The desert locust (Schistocerca gregaria) is a species of locust, a periodically swarming, short-horned grasshopper in the family Acrididae. They are found primarily in the deserts and dry areas of northern and eastern Africa, Arabia, and southwest Asia. During population surge years, they may extend north into parts of western Spain and southern Italy, south into Eastern Africa, and east in northern India. The desert locust shows periodic changes in its body form and can change in response to environmental conditions, over several generations, from a solitary, shorter-winged, highly fecund, non-migratory form to a gregarious, long-winged, and migratory phase in which they may travel long distances into new areas. In some years, they may thus form locust plagues, invading new areas, where they may consume all vegetation including crops, and at other times, they may live unnoticed in small numbers. 

During plague years, desert locusts can cause widespread damage to crops, as they are highly mobile and feed on large quantities of any kind of green vegetation, including crops, pasture, and fodder. Even a very small,  locust swarm can eat the same amount of food in a day as about 35,000 people. 

As an international transboundary pest that threatens agricultural production and livelihoods in many countries in Africa, the Near East, and southwest Asia, their populations have been routinely monitored through a collaborative effort between countries and the United Nations Food and Agriculture Organization (FAO) Desert Locust Information Service (DLIS), which provides global and national assessments, forecasts, and early warning to affected countries and the international community. The desert locust's migratory nature and capacity for rapid population growth present major challenges for control, particularly in remote semiarid areas, which characterize much of their range. 

Locusts differ from other grasshoppers in their ability to change from a solitary living form into gregarious, highly mobile, adult swarms and hopper bands, as their numbers and densities increase. They exist in different states known as recessions (with low and intermediate numbers), rising to local outbreaks and regional upsurges with increasingly high densities, to plagues consisting of numerous swarms. They have two to five generations per year. The desert locust risk increases with a one-to-two-year continuum of favourable weather (greater frequency of rains) and habitats that support population increases leading to upsurges and plagues.

The desert locust is potentially the most dangerous of the locust pests because of the ability of swarms to fly rapidly across great distances.  The major desert locust upsurge in 2004–05 caused significant crop losses in West Africa and diminished food security in the region. The 2019–2021 upsurge caused similar losses in northeast Africa, the Near East, and southwest Asia.

Description 
The genus Schistocerca consists of more than 30 species,  distributed in Africa, Asia, and North and South America, and many species are difficult to identify due to the presence of variable morphs. It is the only genus within the Cyrtacanthacridinae that occurs in both the New and Old World. Most species have the fastigium deflexed and lack lateral carinae on the pronotum. The hind tibiae have smooth margins with numerous spines, but have no apical spine on the outer margin. The second tarsal segment is half as long as the first. Males in the genus have broad anal cerci and a split subgenital plate. The genus is thought to have originated in Africa and then speciated in the New World after a dispersal event that took place 6 to 7 million years ago.

The solitary phase insects (or solitaria morph) are greenish in early instars, while older adults are greyish. The solitary phase grasshoppers lack black patterning as present in the gregarious (or gregaria morph) phase, where the body is pinkish in early instars and yellow in adults.

The second and third pairs of spiracles are permanently open.

Lifecycle
The lifecycle of the desert locust consists of three stages, the egg, the nymph known as a hopper, and the winged adult. Copulation takes place when a mature male hops onto the back of a mature female and grips her body with his legs. Sperm is transferred from the tip of his abdomen to the tip of hers, where it is stored. The process takes several hours and one insemination is sufficient for a number of batches of eggs.

The female locust then seeks suitable soft soil in which to lay her eggs. It needs to be the right temperature and degree of dampness and be in close proximity to other egg-laying females. She probes the soil with her abdomen and digs a hole into which an egg pod containing up to 100 eggs is deposited. The eggs are surrounded by foam and this hardens into a membrane and plugs the hole above the egg pod. The eggs absorb moisture from the surrounding soil. The incubation period before the eggs hatch may be two weeks, or much longer, depending on the temperature.

The newly hatched nymph soon begins to feed, and if it is a gregarious individual, is attracted to other hoppers and they group together. As it grows, it needs to moult (shed its exoskeleton). Its hard cuticle splits and its body expands, while the new exoskeleton is still soft. The stages between moulting are called instars and the desert locust nymph undergoes five moults before becoming a winged adult. Immature and mature individuals in the gregarious phase form bands that feed, bask, and move as cohesive units, while solitary-phase individuals do not seek conspecifics.

After the fifth moult, the insect  is not yet mature. It is at first soft and pink with drooping wings, but over the course of a few days, the cuticle hardens and  haemolymph is pumped into the wings, which stiffens them. Maturation can occur in 2–4 weeks when the food supply and weather conditions are suitable but may take as long as 6 months when they are less ideal. Males start maturing first and give off an odour that stimulates maturation in the females. On maturing, the insects turn yellow and the abdomens of the females start swelling with developing eggs.

Ecology and swarming

Desert locusts have a solitary phase and a gregarious phase, a type of polyphenism. Solitary locusts nymphs and adults can behave gregariously within a few hours of being placed in a crowded situation, while gregarious locusts need one or more generations to become solitary when reared in isolation. Differences in morphology and behaviour are seen between the two phases. In the solitary phase, the hoppers do not group together into bands but move about independently. Their colouring in the later instars tends to be greenish or brownish to match the colour of their surrounding vegetation. The adults fly at night and are also coloured so as to blend into their surroundings, the immature adults being grey or beige and the mature adults being a pale yellowish colour. In the gregarious phase, the hoppers bunch together and in the later instars develop a bold colouring with black markings on a yellow background. The immatures are pink and the mature adults are bright yellow and fly during the day in dense swarms.

The change from an innocuous solitary insect to a voracious gregarious one normally follows a period of drought, when rain falls and vegetation flushes occur in major desert locust breeding locations. The population builds up rapidly and the competition for food increases. As hoppers get more crowded, the close physical contact causes the insects' hind legs to bump against one another. This stimulus triggers a cascade of metabolic and behavioral changes that causes the insects to transform from the solitary to the gregarious phase. When the hoppers become gregarious, their colouration changes from largely green to yellow and black, and the adults change from brown to pink (immature) or yellow (mature). Their bodies become shorter, and they give off a pheromone that causes them to be attracted to each other, enhancing hopper band and subsequently swarm formation. The nymphal pheromone is different from the adult one. When exposed to the adult pheromone, hoppers become confused and disoriented, because they can apparently no longer "smell" each other, though the visual and tactile stimuli remain. After a few days, the hopper bands disintegrate and those that escape predation become solitary again. This effect could aid locust control in the future.

During quiet periods, called recessions, desert locusts are confined to a  belt that extends from Mauritania through the Sahara Desert in northern Africa, across the Arabian Peninsula, and into northwest India. Under optimal ecological and climatic conditions, several successive generations can occur, causing swarms to form and invade countries on all sides of the recession area, as far north as Spain and Russia, as far south as Nigeria and Kenya, and as far east as India and southwest Asia.

Locust swarms fly with the wind at roughly the speed of the wind. Therefore, swarms cannot cross tall mountain ranges such as the Atlas, the Hindu Kush, or the Himalayas. They do not venture into the rain forests of Africa nor into central Europe. However, locust adults and swarms regularly cross the Red Sea between Africa and the Arabian Peninsula, and are even reported to have crossed the Atlantic Ocean from Africa to the Caribbean in 10 days during the 1987-89 plague. The locust can live between 3 and 6 months, and a 10- to 16-fold increase in locust numbers occurs from one generation to the next.

Crop loss
Desert locusts consume an estimated equivalent of their body weight each day in green vegetation. They are polyphagous and feed on leaves, shoots, flowers, fruit, seeds, stems, and bark. Nearly all crops and noncrop plants are eaten, including pearl millet, maize, sorghum, barley, rice, pasture grasses, sugarcane, cotton, fruit trees, date palms, banana plants, vegetables, and weeds.

Crop loss from locusts was noted in the Bible and Qur'an; these insects have been documented as contributing to the severity of a number of Ethiopian famines. Since the early 20th century, desert locust plagues occurred in 1926–1934, 1940–1948, 1949–1963, 1967–1969, 1987–1989, 2003–2005, and 2019–2020. In March–October 1915, a plague of locusts stripped Ottoman Palestine of almost all vegetation. The significant crop loss caused by swarming desert locusts exacerbates problems of food shortage, and is a threat to food security.

Early warning and preventive control
Early warning and preventive control is the strategy adopted by locust-affected countries in Africa and Asia to try to stop locust plagues from developing and spreading. In the 1920s-1930s, locust control became a major field for international cooperation. The International Agricultural Institute developed several programmes aimed at exchanging data about the desert locust and international conferences were held in the 1930s: Rome in 1931, Paris in 1932, London in 1934, Cairo in 1936, and Brussels in 1938. Colonial empires were heavily involved in these attempts to control locust pests, which affected heavily the Middle East and parts of Africa. The USSR also used locust control as a way to expand its influence in the Middle East and Central Asia.

FAO's Desert Locust Information Service (DLIS) in Rome monitors the weather, ecological conditions, and the locust situation on a daily basis. DLIS receives results of survey and control operations carried out by national teams in affected countries. The teams use a variety of innovative digital devices, eLocust3, to collect, record and transmit standardized data in real-time to their national locust centres for decision-making. This data is automatically integrated into SWARMS, the global monitoring and early warning system operated by DLIS. Within this system, the field data are combined with the latest satellite imagery to actively monitor rainfall, vegetation and soil moisture conditions in the locust breeding area from West Africa to India. This is supplemented by sub-seasonal and seasonal temperature and rainfall predictions up to six months in advance as well as other weather forecasts and data from NOAA and ECMWF. Models are used to estimate egg and hopper development rates and swarm trajectories (NOAA HYSPLIT) and dispersion (UK Met Office NAME). DLIS uses a custom GIS to analyze the field data, satellite imagery, weather predictions and model results to assess the current situation and forecast the timing, scale, and location of breeding and migration up to six weeks in advance. The situation assessments and forecasts are published in monthly locust bulletins that date back to the 1970s. These are supplemented by warnings and alerts to affected countries and the international community. This information is available on the FAO Locust Watch website. DLIS continuously adopts the latest technologies as innovative tools, including drones, to improve monitoring and early warning. FAO also provides information and training to affected countries and coordinates funding from donor agencies in case of major upsurges and plagues.

The desert locust is a difficult pest to control, and control measures are further compounded by the large and often remote areas where locusts can be found. Undeveloped basic infrastructure in some affected countries, limited resources for locust monitoring and control, and political turmoil within and between affected countries further reduce the capacity of a country to undertake the necessary monitoring and control activities.

At present, the primary method of controlling desert locust infestations is with insecticides applied in small, concentrated doses by vehicle-mounted and aerial sprayers at ultra-low volume  rates of application. The insecticide is acquired by the insect directly, meaning that control must be precise. Control is undertaken by government agencies in locust-affected countries or by specialized regional aerial organizations such as the Desert Locust Control Organization for East Africa (DLCO-EA).

The desert locust has natural enemies such as predatory wasps and flies, parasitoid wasps, predatory beetle larvae, birds, and reptiles. These may be effective at keeping solitary populations in check but are of limited effects against gregarious desert locusts because of the enormous numbers of insects in the swarms and hopper bands.

Farmers often try mechanical means of killing locusts, such as digging trenches and burying hopper bands, but this is very labour-intensive and is difficult to undertake when large infestations are scattered over a wide area. Farmers also try to scare locust swarms away from their fields by making noise, burning tires, or other methods. This tends to shift the problem to neighbouring farms, and locust swarms can easily return to reinfest previously visited fields.

Biopesticides
Biopesticides include fungi, bacteria, neem extract, and pheromones. The effectiveness of many biopesticides equals that of conventional chemical pesticides, but two distinct differences exist. Biopesticides in general take longer to kill insects, plant diseases, or weeds, usually between 2 and 10 days.

The two types of biopesticides are biochemical and microbial. Biochemical pesticides are similar to naturally occurring chemicals and are nontoxic, such as insect pheromones used to locate mates, while microbial biopesticides, come from bacteria, fungi, algae, or viruses that either occur naturally or are genetically altered. Entomopathogenic fungi generally suppress pests by mycosis - causing a disease that is specific to the insect.

Biological control products have been under development since the late 1990s; Green Muscle and NOVACRID are based on a naturally occurring entomopathogenic fungus, Metarhizium acridum. Species of Metarhizium are widespread throughout the world, infecting many groups of insects, but show low risk to humans, other mammals, and birds. The species M. acridum has specialised in short-horned grasshoppers, to which these locusts belong, so has been chosen as the active ingredient of the product.

The product is available in Australia under the name Green Guard and in Africa, it used to be available as Green Muscle. However, since Green Muscle seems to have disappeared from the market, another product, NOVACRID, was developed for Africa, Central Asia, and the Middle East. These products are applied in the same way as chemical insecticides, but do not kill as quickly. At recommended doses, the fungus can take up to two weeks to kill up to 90% of the locusts. For that reason, it is recommended for use mainly against hoppers, the wingless early stages of locusts. These are mostly found in the desert, far from cropping areas, where the delay in death does not result in damage. The advantage of the product is that it affects only grasshoppers and locusts, which makes it much safer than chemical insecticides. Specifically, it allows the natural enemies of locusts and grasshoppers to continue their beneficial work. These include birds, parasitoid and predatory wasps, parasitoid flies, and certain species of beetles. Though natural enemies cannot prevent plagues, they can limit the frequency of outbreaks and contribute to their control. Biopesticides are also safer to use in environmentally sensitive areas such as national parks or near rivers and other water bodies.

Green Muscle was developed under the LUBILOSA programme, which was initiated in 1989 in response to environmental concerns over the heavy use of chemical insecticides to control locusts and grasshoppers during the 1987-89 plague. The project focused on the use of beneficial disease-causing microorganisms (pathogens) as biological control agents for grasshoppers and locusts. These insects were considered to be too mobile and to reproduce too fast to be readily controlled by classical biological control. Pathogens have the advantage that many can be produced in artificial culture in large quantities and be used with ordinary spraying equipment. Entomopathogenic fungi were traditionally seen as needing humid conditions to work well. However, the LUBILOSA programme found a way to avoid this by spraying fungal spores in an oil formulation. Even under desert conditions, Green Muscle can be used to kill locusts and other acridid pests, such as the Senegalese grasshopper. During trials in Algeria and Mauritania in 2005 and 2006, various natural enemies, but especially birds, were abundant enough to eliminate treated hopper bands in about a week, because the diseased hoppers became sluggish and easy to catch.

Desert locust plagues and upsurges
In the 1900s, there were six major desert locust plagues, one of which last almost 13 years.

1915 Ottoman Syria locust infestation

From March to October 1915, swarms of locusts stripped areas in and around Palestine, Mount Lebanon and Syria of almost all vegetation. This infestation seriously compromised the already-depleted food supply of the region and sharpened the misery of all Jerusalemites.

1960s to present
Since the early 1960s, there have been two desert locust plagues (1967-1968 and 1986-1989) and six desert locust upsurges (1972-1974, 1992-1994, 1994-1996, 2004-2005, 1996-1998 and 2019-2021).

2004–2005 upsurge (West Africa)

From October 2003 to May 2005, West Africa faced the largest and most numerous desert locust infestations in 15 years. The upsurge started as small, independent outbreaks that developed in Mauritania, Mali, Niger, and Sudan in the autumn of 2003. Two days of unusually heavy rains that stretched from Dakar, Senegal, to Morocco in October allowed breeding conditions to remain favourable for the next 6 months and the desert locusts rapidly increased. Lack of rain and cold temperatures in the winter breeding area of northwest Africa in early 2005 slowed the development of the locusts and allowed the locust control agencies to stop the cycle. The costs of fighting this upsurge have been estimated by the FAO to have exceeded US$400 million, and harvest losses were valued at up to US$2.5 billion, which had disastrous effects on food security in West Africa. The countries affected by the 2004-2005 upsurge were Algeria, Burkina Faso, the Canary Islands, Cape Verde, Chad, Egypt, Ethiopia, the Gambia, Greece, Guinea, Guinea Bissau, Israel, Jordan, Lebanon, Libyan Arab Jamahiriya, Mali, Mauritania, Morocco, Niger, Saudi Arabia, Senegal, Sudan, Syria, and Tunisia.

2019–2021 desert locust upsurge

In May 2018, Cyclone Mekunu brought unprecedented rainfall to the Empty Quarter of the Arabian Peninsula that was followed by Cyclone Luban that brought heavy rains again to the same area in October. This allowed conditions to be favourable for three generations of breeding, which caused an estimated 8,000-fold increase in Desert Locust numbers that went unchecked because the area was so remote it could not be accessed by national locust teams. 

In early 2019, waves of swarms migrated from this remote and inaccessible area north to the interior of Saudi Arabia and southern Iran, and southwest to the interior of Yemen. Both areas received good rains, including heavy flooding in southwest Iran (the worst in 50 years), that allowed another two generations of breeding to take place. While control operations were mounted against the northern movement and subsequent breeding, very little could be done in Yemen due to the ongoing conflict. As a result, new swarms formed that crossed the southern Red Sea and the Gulf of Aden and invaded the Horn of Africa, specifically northeast Ethiopia and northern Somalia in June 2019. Again, good rains allowed further breeding during the summer, followed by another generation of widespread breeding during the autumn in eastern Ethiopia and central Somalia, which was exacerbated by the unusually late occurring Cyclone Pawan in northeast Somalia in early December. The swarms that subsequently formed invaded Kenya in late December 2019 and spread throughout the country where they bred in between the rainy seasons because of unusual rainfall. Kenya had only witnessed swarm invasions twice in the past 75 years (1955 and 2007). Some swarms also invaded Uganda, South Sudan, Tanzania and one swarmlet reached northeast D.R. Congo, the first time since 1945. 

The situation improved in Kenya and elsewhere by the summer of 2020 due to large-scale aerial control operations, made available by generous assistance from international partners. Nevertheless, food security and livelihoods were impacted throughout the region. Despite the control efforts, good rains continued to fall and breeding occurred again during the summer and autumn in Ethiopia and Somalia that led to another invasion of Kenya in December 2020, which was eventually brought under control by spring 2021. Again, unexpected rains fell in late April and early May, this time further north that allowed substantial breeding to occur in eastern Ethiopia and northern Somalia in May and June 2021. New swarms formed in June and July that moved to northeast Ethiopia for a generation of breeding that could not be addressed due to conflict and insecurity, which prolonged the upsurge in the Horn of Africa. The upsurge was finally brought under control by early 2022 as a result of successful and intensive control operations in northern Somalia and poor rainfall.  there are no locust crises anywhere in the world but swarms are expected in October in the Sahel, Yemen and on the India–Pakistan border.

In southwest Asia, the upsurge was brought under control much  earlier because of a massive effort undertaken by India and Pakistan along both sides of their common border during the summer of 2020 that followed from earlier control operations during the spring of 2019 and 2020 by Iran and during the summer of 2019 by Pakistan and India.  In June 2020, Cyclone Nisarga helped spread swarms across the northern states of India where a few reached the Himalayan foothills in Nepal. 

In response to the upsurge, the Director-General of FAO declared a Level 3 corporate-wide emergency, the highest level in the UN system, on 17 January 2020 and appealed for immediate international assistance to rapidly upscale monitoring and control activities in the Horn of Africa. One month later, Somalia declared a state of emergency. Similarly, Pakistan also declared a state of emergency. The UN continued to warn that the Horn of Africa was facing a dangerous situation. 

Fortunately, the international community responded quickly and generously despite other urgent situations such as COVID-19, and the $230 million appeal by FAO was fully funded. This  allowed ground and aerial operations to treat  of desert locust in the Horn of Africa and Yemen in 2020 and 2021. Up to 20 aircraft were deployed simultaneously, supported by hundreds of ground teams, and more than 1.4 million locations were surveyed. These collective efforts averted  of crop losses, saved  of milk production, and secured food for nearly 47 million people. The commercial value of the cereal and milk loss averted is estimated at $1.77 billion.

FAO's Locust Watch contains the latest situation and forecasts as well as a full, detailed description of the recent upsurge.

Pheromones 
The swarming pheromone guaiacol is produced in the gut of desert locusts by the breakdown of plant material. This process is undertaken by the gut bacterium Pantoea (Enterobacter) agglomerans. Guaiacol is one of the main components of the pheromones that cause locust swarming. Pheromones also accelerate S. gregaria development. Mahamat et al., 1993 find that an undifferentiated mix of several volatiles derived from the males of the species (including guaiacol) speed up the maturation process of both immature males and females.

In research 
S. gregaria was one of the organisms examined by McNeill and Hoyle 1967 and found to have thinner muscle filaments than those before found. This contributed greatly to the development of the sliding filament theory.

In culture 
Given the long history of desert locust, it is to be expected that references of the world's most dangerous migratory pest have crept into popular film and literature as well as many of the world's religions.

Film
Owing to the destructive habits of locusts, they have been a representation of famine in many Middle Eastern cultures, and are seen in the movies The Mummy (1999) and The Bible (1966).

Religious books
This species has been identified as one of the kosher species of locusts mentioned in Leviticus 11:22 by several rabbinical authorities among Middle Eastern Jewish communities.

Literature
 1939 - The Day of the Locust by Nathanael West.
 1948 - Poka by Premendra Mitra.

References

Further reading 
AFROL News, Stronger efforts to fight West Africa's locusts Oct. 1, 2004 afrol News - Stronger efforts to fight West Africa's locusts
FAO Locust Watch (Desert Locust Information Service) 
Lindsey, R. 2002. Locust!

OECD, The Desert Locust Outbreak in West Africa – Sept. 23, 2004 The Desert Locust Outbreak in West Africa – OECD
Programme on biological control of locusts and grasshoppers (LUBILOSA) Wayback Machine
Nature Magazine Article on combating desert locust through natural enemies 
Jahn, G. C. 1993. Supplementary environmental assessment of the Eritrean Locust Control Program. USAID, Washington DC. Wayback Machine
Abdin, A. Stein & A. van Huis, 2001. Spatial distribution of the desert locust, Schistocerca gregaria, in the plains of the Red Sea coast of Sudan during the winter of 1999.
Ceccato, P., K. Cressman, A. Giannini, S. Trzaska. 2007. The desert locust upsurge in West Africa (2003–2005): Information on the desert locust early warning system and the prospects for seasonal climate forecasting. Intl J Pest Management 53(1): 7-13.
Cressman, K. 1996. Current methods of desert locust forecasting at FAO. Bulletin OEPP/EPPO Bulletin 26: 577–585.
Cressman, K. 2008. The use of new technologies in Desert Locust early warning. Outlooks on Pest Management (April, 2008): 55–59.
Cressman, K. 2013. Role of remote sensing in desert locust early warning. J. Appl. Remote Sens. 7 (1): 075098; DOI 10.1117/1.JRS.7.075098
Cressman, K. 2013. Climate change and locusts in the WANA Region. In M.V.K Sivakumar et al (eds.), Climate Change and Food Security in West Asia and North Africa. (pp. 131-143). Netherlands: Springer. DOI 10.1007/978-94-007-6751-5_7
Cressman, K. 2016. Desert Locust. In: J.F. Shroder, R. Sivanpillai (eds.), Biological and Environmental Hazards, Risks, and Disasters (pp. 87-105). USA: Elsevier.
Dinku, T., Ceccato, P., Cressman, K., and Connor, S.J. 2010. Evaluating detection skills of satellite rainfall estimates over Desert Locust recession regions. J Applied Meteorology and Climatology 49 (6): 1322-1332. 
Guershon, M. & A. Ayali, 2012. Innate phase behavior in the desert locust, Schistocerca gregaria. Insect Science. Innate phase behavior in the desert locust, Schistocerca gregaria
Pekel, J., Ceccato, P., Vancutsem, C., Cressman, K., Vanbogaert, E. and Defourny, P. 2010. Development and application of multi-temporal colorimetric transformation to monitor vegetation in the Desert Locust habitat. IEEE J. of Selected Topics in Applied Earth Observations and Remote Sensing 4 (2): 318-326.
Stefanski, R. and K. Cressman. 2015. Weather and Desert Locust. World Meteorological Organization, Geneva, Switzerland. 
Symmons, P. & A. van Huis, 1997. Desert Locust Control campaign studies: operations guidebook. Wageningen University. 167 pp. & CD-Rom, 19 floppy disks.
Symmons, P.M. and K. Cressman. 2001. Desert Locust Guidelines: I. Survey. Food and Agriculture Organization of the United Nations, Rome, Italy.
Van Huis, A. 1994. Desert locust control with existing techniques: an evaluation of strategies. Proceedings of the Seminar held in Wageningen, the Netherlands, 6–11 December 1993. 132 pp. .
Van Huis, A. 1995. Desert locust plagues. Endeavour, 19(3): 118–124.
Van Huis, A. 1997. Can we prevent desert locust plagues? In: New strategies in locust control (Eds.: S. Krall, R. Preveling and D.B. Diallo), pp. 453–459. Birkhäuser Verlag, Basel. 522 pp.

Werf, W. van der, G. Woldewahid, T. Abate, M. Butrous, O. Abdalla, A.M. Khidir, B. Mustafa, I. Magzoub, O.
Vallebona C, Genesio L, Crisci A, Pasqui M, Di Vecchia A, Maracchi G (2008). Large-scale climatic patterns forcing desert locust upsurges in West Africa. CLIMATE RESEARCH (2008) 37:35–41. . Large-scale climatic patterns forcing desert locust upsurges in West Africa
Waldner, F., Defourny, P., Babah Ebbe, M. A., and Cressman, K. 2015. Operational Monitoring of the Desert Locust Habitat with Earth Observation: An Assessment. Int. J. Geo-Inf. 4 (1): 2379-2400 DOI 10.3390/ijgi4042379
Walford, G. F. 1963. Arabian Locust Hunter. London, Robert Hale.

External links

Desert Locust crisis in the Horn of Africa - FAO Website
FAO Locust Watch site
Lubilosa site
Delivery systems
Why Locusts Swarm: A Study Finds 'Tipping Point'
Columbia University IRI Climate and Desert Locust 
Desert Locust Meteorological Monitoring, at Sahel Resources
Cultivation of locusts for the pet trade
Modelling insect wings using the finite element method

Locusts
Orthoptera of Africa
Insects described in 1775
Agricultural pest insects
Food security
Animal migration
Orthoptera of Asia
Insect pests of millets